Jonas Björkman and Max Mirnyi were the defending champions, but lost in the second round to Novak Djokovic and Nenad Zimonjić.

Jonathan Erlich and Andy Ram won in the final 4–6, 6–3, [13–11], against Bob Bryan and Mike Bryan.

Seeds
All seeds received a bye into the second round.

Draw

Finals

Top half

Bottom half

External links
Draw

Doubles